California's 56th State Assembly district is one of 80 California State Assembly districts. It is currently represented by Democrat Eduardo Garcia of Coachella.

District profile 
The district encompasses the Imperial Valley and parts of the Coachella Valley and Colorado Desert. The district is primarily rural and heavily Latino.

All of Imperial County
 Brawley
 Calexico
 Calipatria
 El Centro
 Holtville
 Imperial
 Westmorland

Riverside County – 13.3%
 Bermuda Dunes
 Blythe
 Cathedral City
 Coachella
 Desert Center
 Desert Hot Springs
 Indio
 Mecca
 Thermal
 Thousand Palms

Election results from statewide races

List of Assembly Members 
Due to redistricting, the 56th district has been moved around different parts of the state. The current iteration resulted from the 2011 redistricting by the California Citizens Redistricting Commission.

Election results 1992 - present

2020

2018

2016

2014

2012

2010

2008

2006

2004

2002

2000

1998

1996

1994

1992

See also 
 California State Assembly
 California State Assembly districts
 Districts in California

References

External links 
 District map from the California Citizens Redistricting Commission

56
Government of Imperial County, California
Assembly
Coachella Valley
Imperial Valley
Colorado Desert
Blythe, California
Brawley, California
Calexico, California
Cathedral City, California
Coachella, California
Desert Center, California
Desert Hot Springs, California
El Centro, California
El Centro metropolitan area
Indio, California